This is a list of ferries that service (either currently or previously) the River Derwent and surrounds (such as the Huon River, Tasman Peninsula, and D'Entrecasteaux Channel around the Australian city of Hobart in the Australian island state of Tasmania.

Current

Previously

References

Sources
 John Duffy and Louis Rodway, The Cock of the River "Cartela", 1996
 https://web.archive.org/web/20140927001436/http://hobartwatertaxis.com/about-us/

Lists of ferries
Tasmania-related lists
Ferries of Tasmania
Maritime history of Tasmania